Nassim Akrour (born July 10, 1974) is an Algerian footballer and coach who currently plays for Chambéry and coaches the youth team at Annecy, whom he represented as a player between 2016 and 2019. At international level, he has represented Algeria, earning 18 caps and scoring six goals between 2001 and 2004.

Akrour is the all-time leading scorer of French club Grenoble Foot 38 with 94 league goals.

Club career
Akrour was born in Courbevoie, France. He began his career with Olympique Noisy-le-Sec, moving to England in 1997 to join Sutton United, where he scored 19 goals in 41 appearances during the 1998-99 season as the club won promotion to the Football Conference.
He left Sutton in 1999, joining new divisional rivals Woking; he was a fixture of the team throughout the 1999-2000 season, scoring twelve league goals as Woking finished in mid-table.

Akrour returned to his native France in the summer of 2000 to join FC Istres, where he scored sixteen goals in his first season as the team earned promotion to Division 2, and matched that tally in his second season.
This good form prompted Troyes to sign Akrour in 2002, but he struggled to adapt to Ligue 1, managing only 13 appearances and one goal. He stayed with the club following their relegation, and again proved a regular scorer at Ligue 2 level, this time scoring 9 times in 31 games.

He moved to Grenoble in 2004, beginning a six-year association with the club; scoring at least ten goals a season for three consecutive seasons between 2005 and 2008, he reached his peak in his early thirties, helping the team to promotion to Ligue 1 in 2008, and survival the following year.

In July 2010, Akrour returned to FC Istres, signing a one-year contract with an option for a second year. He remained with Istres until the summer of 2013, when he rejoined Grenoble, who were now playing in the fourth tier of French football.

Akrour scored regularly for Grenoble in the fourth division, registering twelve in 25 appearances as they missed out on promotion by four points in 2013-14, then 16 in 29 appearances as they missed out by one point the following season, and 12 in 29 appearances as they missed out by three points in 2015-16.

Now aged 42, Akrour moved to Annecy in 2016; he initially announced his retirement from playing in July 2019 aged 45, in order to take up a role as a youth coach with the club, but reversed this decision six months later when he signed as a player for Chambéry.

He scored on his début for Chambéry in a friendly match, and followed this with good performances in the league, managing two goals in six appearances before the end of the 2019-20 season.
Akrour remained with the club into his 48th year and the 2021-22 season, continuing to score with some regularity.

International career
On December 5, 2001, Akrour made his debut for the Algerian national team as a 60th-minute substitute in a 1–1 friendly with Ghana in Algiers.

Akrour was a member of the Algerian 2002 African Nations Cup team, who were eliminated in the first round after finishing last in their group. He played in all three of Algeria's games, starting in one, and scored one goal in the second group game against Liberia.

He was also part of the Algerian 2004 African Nations Cup team, who finished second in their group in the first round of competition before being defeated by Morocco in the quarter-finals.

National team statistics

International goals

References

External links
 
 

1974 births
Living people
Kabyle people
French sportspeople of Algerian descent
French people of Kabyle descent
People from Courbevoie
Association football forwards
Algerian footballers
French footballers
Olympique Noisy-le-Sec players
Sutton United F.C. players
Woking F.C. players
FC Istres players
ES Troyes AC players
Le Havre AC players
Grenoble Foot 38 players
FC Annecy players
Ligue 1 players
Ligue 2 players
Championnat National players
Championnat National 2 players
Algeria international footballers
Algerian expatriate footballers
Algerian expatriate sportspeople in England
Expatriate footballers in England
French expatriate footballers
French expatriate sportspeople in England
2002 African Cup of Nations players
2004 African Cup of Nations players
Footballers from Hauts-de-Seine
Chambéry SF players